Gyrn Moelfre is a mountain in Powys, mid Wales, near the border with Shropshire. It stands to the south-east of the Berwyns, from which it is separated by Afon Ysgwennant. The village of Llansilin lies on its south-west slopes. It was historically in Denbighshire, but the area was transferred to Powys in 1996.

In the modern era, the "Gyrn" has played host to the British Downhill Series and some other smaller events on the downhill calendar 

Marilyns of Wales
Mountains and hills of Powys